The Ministry of Livestock and Fisheries is a government ministry in Tanzania. Its mission is to "build and support the technical and professional capacity of local government authorities and [the] private sector ... to develop, manage, and regulate the livestock and fisheries resources sustainably."

The Minister for Livestock and Fisheries is Abdallah Ulega.

Blue Economy Drive
Tanzania has adopted the blue economy drive by setting aside a huge amount to improve productivity & efficiency in fish farming and deep sea fishing.

Government of Tanzania are set to supply Small and Medium Entrepreneurs with 320 modern fishing boats so they can benefit from the Blue economy.

References

External links
 

L
Tanzania
Livestock ministries